Cape Cross (13 March 1994 – 21 April 2017) was an Irish-bred Thoroughbred racehorse. He is a son of the July Cup winner Green Desert and Cheveley Park Stakes, winner Park Appeal who was the Champion two-year-old filly in England and Ireland in 1984.

Racing career
As a two-year-old Cape Cross raced twice, winning his maiden on the second attempt. His first start as a three-year-old was in the Craven Stakes, where he finished third. This was followed by an eighth place in the 2000 Guineas. He only won once as a three-year-old. He won the Lockinge Stakes as a four-year-old, when starting a 20/1 outsider. He won twice as a five-year-old, the Queen Anne Stakes at Royal Ascot and the Celebration Mile.

Stud career
Since retiring to stud, Cape Cross has sired the winners of 21 group 1 races worldwide. he stood at the Kildangan Stud in Ireland at a fee of €35,000. In March 2016 he was retired from stallion duty after suffering fertility problems. He was Euthanized on 21 April 2017 due to infirmities of old age.

Notable progeny

c = colt, f = filly, g = gelding

Pedigree

References

 Racing Post - Cape Cross

1994 racehorse births
2017 racehorse deaths
Racehorses bred in Ireland
Thoroughbred family 14-c
Chefs-de-Race
Champion Thoroughbred Sires of France